Mohamed Sylla is the name of:

Mohamed Sylla (footballer, born 1971), Guinean footballer
Mohamed Ofei Sylla (born 1974), Guinean footballer
Mohamed Sylla (footballer, born 1993), French footballer
MHD (rapper) (born 1994), French rapper
Mohamed Sydney Sylla (born 1996), Burkinabé footballer

See also
Mohamed Sillah (born 1949), Sierra Leonean politician
Mohamed Sillah (footballer) (born 1983), Sierra Leonean footballer
Mohammed Sylla (born 1977), Guinean footballer
Mamadou Sylla (disambiguation), various